Artur Mikvabia (born 22 May 1949) is an economist and politician from Abkhazia. He was Prime Minister in the Government of President Khajimba between 20 March 2015 and 26 July 2016.

Chairman of United Abkhazia (2004–2009)
Artur Mikvabia became Chairman of United Abkhazia when it was founded as socio-political movement on 25 March 2004. On 25 July 2007, he announced that he would resign his post and retire from politics, but members stated that they would not accept this, and Mikvabia remained chairman. On 27 January 2009 United Abkhazia was transformed into a political party and Daur Tarba became the new chairman.

Prime Minister (2015–2016)

Mikvabia was appointed Prime Minister by Khajimba on 20 March 2015. Following a motion a pending motion of no-confidence against him, the storming of the Interior Ministry by opposition activists and a failed referendum to bring about an early presidential election, Mikvabia announced his resignation on 26 July 2016, accepted on the same day by Khajimba. In an interview with Caucasian Knot, Mikvabia stated that the strong unrest in society was being caused by the government's efforts to structurally improve the financial situation of Abkhazia through measures such as the introduction of VAT, that he did not want to work under conditions where society itself hindered development and that he hoped his resignation would defuse tensions.

References

5th convocation of the People's Assembly of Abkhazia
Living people
Prime Ministers of Abkhazia
1949 births